Atlas Obscura is an American-based online magazine and travel company. It was founded in 2009 by author Joshua Foer and documentary filmmaker/author Dylan Thuras. It catalogs unusual and obscure travel destinations via user-generated content. The articles on the website cover a number of topics including history, science, food, and obscure places.

History

Thuras and Foer met in 2007, and soon discussed ideas for a different kind of atlas, featuring places not commonly found in guidebooks. They hired a web designer in 2008 and launched Atlas Obscura in 2009.

Sommer Mathis (formerly of The Atlantic's CityLab) was the site's Editor in Chief from 2017 to 2020. She was succeeded by Samir Patel, formerly of Archaeology magazine, who became the site's Editorial Director in 2020 and Editor in Chief in 2021.

David Plotz remained as the site's CEO for five years (October 2014 — November 2019). Warren Webster, former president and CEO of  digital publisher Coveteur, and co-founder of website Patch, assumed the position in March 2020.

Obscura Day

In 2010, the site organized the first of the international events known as Obscura Day. Thuras has stated that one of the site's main goals is "Creating a real-world community who are engaging with us, each other and these places and getting away from their computers to actually see them." As of 2021, Atlas Obscura has originated Atlas Obscura Societies organizing local experiences in nine cities, including New York, Philadelphia, Washington D.C., Chicago, Denver, Los Angeles, and Seattle.

In October 2014, Atlas Obscura hired journalist David Plotz as its CEO. In 2015, Atlas Obscura raised its first round of major funding, securing $2M from a range of investors and angels including The New York Times. In September 2016, the company published its first book, Atlas Obscura: An Explorer's Guide to the World's Hidden Wonders written by Foer, Thuras, and Ella Morton under Workman Publishing Company.

Guided travel
In 2016, the company expanded into travel, offering two guided trips. Since 2019, Atlas Obscura has been leading unusual trips to places like Mexico to witness the Monarch butterfly migration or Lisbon to learn how to make pasteis de nata.

Atlas Obscura's General Manager of Trips, Mike Parker, received praise for his division's vocal reassurance of travelers displaced by the COVID-19 pandemic. Parker explained to customers via email/blog:

"When you join one of our trips, we want you to have peace of mind. We want you to know that, if circumstances change, we’ve got your back. If you join a 2020 departure and ultimately decide that it’s not the right time or place to travel, we’ll help you update your plans by transferring your reservation to a future date, or to another trip, without cancellation penalties. In the unlikely event we need to cancel a departure, we’ll refund everything you’ve paid us for it.”

Gastro Obscura
Following a second fundraising effort that netted $7.5M, in late 2017 the site launched Gastro Obscura, a food section covering "the distinctive food locations of the world."

Daily podcast (COVID-19)
As the COVID-19 quarantine continued to threaten travel plans worldwide, Atlas Obscura determined to bring the sites to their audience (in place of encouraging people to visit the sites in person). To this end they launched a short (12-20 minutes) four-times-per-week podcast. "The Atlas Obscura Podcast" was introduced on 26 February 2021. The first full-length podcast (14 March), "The Gates of Hell" (0:13:02), described a long-burning underground fire in Turkmenistan.

Further reading
 Children's book, The Atlas Obscura Explorer’s Guide for the World’s Most Adventurous Kid, Workman Publishing Company, 2018
 Original book, Atlas Obscura: An Explorer's Guide to the World's Hidden Wonders, Workman Publishing Company, 2016

References

External links
 
 Presentation by Ella Morton on Atlas Obscura: An Explorer’s Guide to the World’s Hidden Wonders, 22 October 2016

Online magazines published in the United States
American travel websites
Magazines established in 2009
Tourism magazines
Magazines published in New York City